The Currency Act 1982 (c 3) is an Act of the Parliament of the United Kingdom.

Background
The Decimal Currency Act 1967 paved the way for the decimalisation of the pound sterling by redefining the denominations of money to "the pound sterling and the new penny, the new penny being one-hundredth part of a pound sterling". Up until then, the pound had consisted of 20 shillings each of 12 pennies; this change formally taking place on 15 February, 1971 (a day known as Decimal Day). All decimal coins subsequently issued by the Royal Mint included the text "NEW PENCE" on the reverse (or "NEW PENNY" in the case of the 1/2p and 1p coins), a term that was in every day use for a significant period afterwards, particularly by the elderly, however by the early 1980s the use of the term "NEW" had fallen out of use.

Provisions
Because the term "new penny" was defined in law, a change in the law would be needed for coins to keep up with common parlance. The Act changed the definition in the 1967 Act so that the denominations of money in the currency would be the "pound sterling and the penny or new penny", with the word "NEW" being with the value of the coin (e.g. "TWO PENCE" instead of "NEW PENCE").

The Act also repealed Section 1(1) of the Decimal Currency Act 1967, the remainder of that Act being repealed in 1986.

References

United Kingdom Acts of Parliament 1982
Legal history of the United Kingdom
History of British coinage
Currencies of the United Kingdom
1982 in economics